The 2020 Wawa 250 Powered by Coca-Cola was the 22nd stock car race of the 2020 NASCAR Xfinity Series season and the 19th iteration of the event. The race was held on Friday, August 28, 2020 in Daytona Beach, Florida at Daytona International Speedway, a  permanent triangular-shaped superspeedway. The race took the scheduled 100 laps to complete. After a wild ending that saw the leaders wreck in the middle of Turn 3-4, Justin Haley of Kaulig Racing would survive the last lap wreck and hold off Gray Gaulding to win the race, the 2nd NASCAR Xfinity Series win of his career and the 2nd of the season. To fill the podium, Gray Gaulding of SS-Green Light Racing and Chase Briscoe of Stewart-Haas Racing would finish 2nd and third, respectively.

Background 
Daytona International Speedway is one of three superspeedways to hold NASCAR races, the other two being Indianapolis Motor Speedway and Talladega Superspeedway. The standard track at Daytona International Speedway is a four-turn superspeedway that is 2.5 miles (4.0 km) long. The track's turns are banked at 31 degrees, while the front stretch, the location of the finish line, is banked at 18 degrees.

Entry list

Starting lineup 
The starting lineup was determined by a metric qualifying system based on the results and fastest lap of the second race of the 2020 Drydene 200 weekend, and owner's points. As a result, Chase Briscoe of Stewart-Haas Racing won the pole.

Race results 
Stage 1 Laps: 30

Stage 2 Laps: 30

Stage 3 Laps: 40

References 

2020 NASCAR Xfinity Series
NASCAR races at Daytona International Speedway
August 2020 sports events in the United States
2020 in sports in Florida